Margaret Mitchell (1900–1949) was an American author.

Margaret Mitchell may also refer to:

Politics
Margaret Mitchell (Canadian politician) (1925–2017), New Democratic Party Member of Parliament
Margaret Mitchell (Scottish politician) (born 1952), Scottish Conservative politician

People 

Maggie Mitchell (1832–1918), American actress
Maggie Mitchell (artist) (1883–1953), British sculptor
Margaret Mitchell, CEO of YWCA USA
Margaret Mitchell (photographer) (born 1968), Scottish photographer
Margaret Mitchell (scientist), computer scientist working on fairness in artificial intelligence and machine learning
Margaret Howell Mitchell (1901–1988), Canadian ornithologist
Margaret J. Mitchell (1860–1952), American writer and dietician
Margaret M. Mitchell (born 1956), scholar
Maggie L. Walker (1867–1934), née Mitchell (1864–1934), Virginia businesswoman and first African American woman banker

Characters
Madge Bishop, also known as Madge Mitchell 
Peggy Mitchell, fictional EastEnders character
Margaret Mitchell, fictional character on the Australian soap opera Home and Away

Other
Margaret Mitchell (Atlanta neighborhood), Buckhead, Atlanta, Georgia